Vygantas Zubavičius (born 14 November 1984) is a Lithuanian former footballer.

Career
He had a trial spell with Scottish club Heart of Midlothian F.C., but failed to win a contract.

References

External links 
 Lithuanian career statistics
 
 

1984 births
Living people
Lithuanian footballers
Association football midfielders
Lithuanian expatriate footballers
Expatriate footballers in Belarus
Expatriate footballers in Estonia
Expatriate footballers in Poland
Expatriate footballers in Germany
FBK Kaunas footballers
FK Šilutė players
FC Partizan Minsk players
JK Sillamäe Kalev players
FK Tauras Tauragė players
Znicz Pruszków players
FK Atlantas players